Rosario Umberto Balsamo, best known as Umberto Balsamo (born 10 March 1942) is an Italian singer-songwriter and composer.

Background 
Born in Catania, Balsamo was the youngest of five brothers. In 1964 he moved to Milan, where he started working together with the lyricist Luciano Beretta, composing songs for, among others, Iva Zanicchi and Orietta Berti. In 1968 he made his debut as a singer with the song  " Il mio cuore riposa", released under the pseudonym Bob Nero. Balsamo obtained his first success in 1972 with the song "Se fossi diversa", which ranked nineteen in the Italian hit parade. The following year he entered the competition at the Sanremo Music Festival with the song "Amore mio". In 1977 he topped the hit parade with the song "L'angelo azzurro", selling over a million of copies In 1979 he had one another major success with the song "Balla", a mixture of tarantella and disco music. In the eighties Balsamo focused on composing, achieving a significant success with the 1988 song "Italia", sung by Mino Reitano at the Sanremo Music Festival.

Discography

Singles

Studio albums
1974 Passato presente e futuro
1975 Natalì
1977 Malgrado tutto...l'angelo azzurro
1978 Crepuscolo d'amore
1979 Balla
1979 Auto Music
1980 Pianeti
1982 Mai più
1990 Respirando la notte luna
1992 Un pugno nella notte
2003 Vorrei aprire il cielo sabato sera a spina di rosa

Compilation albums
1989 L'angelo azzurro e altri successi
1995 Umberto Balsamo - Le sue più belle canzoni

References

External links
 

 

1942 births
Musicians from Catania
Italian singer-songwriters
Italian pop singers
Living people
Composers from Sicily
Italian male composers
20th-century Italian composers
20th-century Italian male musicians